Jalakantapuram Ramaswamy Krishnamoorthy (J. R. Krishnamoorthy) is a doctor from India.

Krishnamoorthy was awarded a Padma Shri in 2010 for his contributions in the field of medicine and his lifetime contributions to society as a medical practitioner in rural India. He has been practicing in Kunrathur, 30 km off Chennai, since the early 1950s and continues to do so at the age of 81.

Krishnamoorthy has motivated scientific spirit in the Siddha system of medicine for giving it a global recognition. This was achieved through publishing several scientific papers, evolving clinically effective formulations and steering committees set up by the Government of India Ministry of Health. He was the original formulator of a simple herbal drug (777 oil) for the treatment of a complex skin disorder similar to psoriasis that previously had no solution in any system of medicine in the world.

References 

 Dr. JRK's Siddha Research and Pharmaceuticals Pvt Ltd
 List of Padma Awardees The Hindu, full list of Padma awardees (PDF - 92.5 Kb)

Living people
Recipients of the Padma Shri in medicine
Indian surgeons
Medical doctors from Tamil Nadu
20th-century Indian medical doctors
Year of birth missing (living people)
20th-century surgeons